Melnik is an unincorporated community located in the town of Gibson, Manitowoc County, Wisconsin, United States. It consists of a handful of houses and the Melnik Presbyterian Church and attached cemetery.

The community was named for Mělník, Czech Republic by some of the many Czech immigrants who came to Wisconsin, including Manitowoc County.

References

Unincorporated communities in Manitowoc County, Wisconsin
Unincorporated communities in Wisconsin